Rengkai is the most populated and one of the three census towns of Churachandpur District.

Geography

Localities
Rengkai is divided into 18 localities constituting a group of houses. Some of these localities vary in size and population. The 18 divisions of Rengkai based on localities are:

Topography
It is bounded between Simveng in the west, Muolvaiphei in the North-east and New Lamka towards the South. The town stretches along the Sugnu Road and ends before the intersection of the road with Teddim Road at Rengkai Road. It is located 1 kilometer towards south from the district's headquarter and 67km from the state capital Imphal. It stretches across an area of 7.5 km. Sq2. It lies along the Khuga river, and is characterized by a relatively plain surface with associated land forms of hills. It is situated at an elevation of 914m. (2,999 ft.) above sea level. Muolhlum hill is the only significant hill found within the town. There is gradual decrease in elevation towards Zote Veng, the eastern corner of the town. The Lanva streams through the town entering the town from Edenthar and meeting the Khuga River at the foot of Zote Veng and Vengthlang.

Government

Village Authority

Churches 
Rengkai being a Christian-dominant town, there is division based on the denomination of the Church. Classification of the Church is based on their beliefs. The different denominations present within the town are:
Independent Church of India
The ICI is an evangelical church, headquartered in Churachandpur, Manipur, with a mission to propagate the Gospel across the Indian sub-continent with a major emphasis on the North Eastern states of India. It was founded by Watkin R. Roberts, a Welsh Presbyterian missionary on 5 February 1910 at Senvon village in the southern part of Manipur state, India and is an indigenous, self-supporting, self-propagating and self-governing evangelical church.

The ICI church in Rengkai promulgated at the time of the village's inception, where its initial church members consisted of 10 households with a total strength of 63. The church has now grown to more than 2000 members.

 United Pentecostal Church

Wesleyan Methodist Church of East India
WMCEI in Rengkai was founded on 6 February 1989 with an initial 63 members from 10 households. The church has now grown to more than 500 members.

Evangelical Assembly Church
Originally called North East India General Mission, the EAC at Rengkai was established on 1982. The total church members currently exceeds 700 in number.

Evangelical Free Church of India
The EFCI in Rengkai was established on 3 June 1972. The number of members at present exceeds 1700.

Rengkai Local Church
Housing more than 250 members, the church settled its name on 10 May 1998 after being previously known as AGMM.

Assemblies of God Church
The AG Church was established in 1962 at Churachandpur, Manipur. 

Lalsungkuo Unity Church
Established on 29 September 1998, the church is located at Muolhlum, Rengkai with total members greater than 200. 

Reformed Presbyterian Church
RPC church was established at Edenthar, Rengkai by Rev. K. Sanga on 23 April 2003. Now the church houses more than 400 members.

World Missionary Evangelism
WME church was established on 15 February 1985 with 50 members at the time. Now it holds more than 100 members.

References

Geography of Manipur